In the military and in shooting, target practice are exercises in which weapons are shot at a target. The purpose of such exercises is to improve the aim or the weapon-handling expertise of the person firing the weapon.

Targets being shot at for practice include:
 with handguns, rifles,  and shotguns: shooting targets,
 by air forces or air defense forces: target drones and target tugs,
 by navies: seaborne targets.

See also
Live fire exercise
Shooting range

References

Military education and training
Ammunition